The Swiss Tropical and Public Health Institute or Swiss TPH (formerly known as the Swiss Tropical Institute) is an international public health institute working in various disciplines with a particular focus on low- and middle-income countries. It was founded in 1943 through the initiative of Rudolf Geigy. Swiss TPH endeavors to the improve the health of populations internationally and nationally through research, services, education, and training, with a focus on developing countries.

In June 2009, the Institute for Social and Preventive Medicine of the University of Basel was integrated into the Swiss Tropical Institute, and in January 2010 the Swiss Tropical Institute changed its name to the Swiss Tropical and Public Health Institute.

The Swiss TPH is an associated institute of the University of Basel, and as a public organization it is partially supported by the Swiss Federal Council and the Canton of Basel-Stadt. The greater part of its funding comes from competitively acquired project funds and the earnings of its service departments.

Research
The institute has research programs in epidemiology, public health, and medical parasitology, covering molecular parasitology, molecular epidemiology, molecular diagnostics, molecular immunology, parasite chemotherapy, biostatistics and epidemiology, health systems research, human and animal health, ecosystem health, and social sciences. One particular research focus of the institute is the biology of the malaria parasite Plasmodium falciparum.

Services
The service departments of the Swiss TPH address travel medicine and drug research, as well as health system development. The medicine department provides clinical and diagnostic services for tropical medicine, travel advice, and vaccinations for travelers to tropical countries, and it also works to bridge "translational gaps" in the R&D-process for drugs, vaccines, and public health interventions between promising research outcomes and their validation and implementation for impact in resource-limited economies. The Swiss Centre for International Health provides services in international health system development, both within Switzerland and globally.

Education and training
As an associated institute of the University of Basel, many Swiss TPH staff have teaching obligations at the university. The institute is involved in the bachelor's programs in biology and also responsible for the newly established doctoral programmes. The institute also offers a master's program in infection biology and epidemiology.

In its graduate programs and continuous education, the Swiss TPH offers several short courses for health system specialists from elsewhere in Europe and countries with resource constraints. These courses are accredited by the University of Basel. In cooperation with partner institutes in Europe and abroad, the institute offers a master's program in advanced studies in international health, accredited by the OAQ (Center of Accreditation and Quality Assurance of the Swiss Universities).

The Swiss TPH also offers several tailored courses for participants with specific backgrounds (medical doctors, pharmacists, and lab technicians), a general tropical course, and courses within the curriculum of the Swiss School of Public Health (SSPH+).

See also 
Science and technology in Switzerland
Health for All Project Albania

Notes and references

External links
Swiss TPH
Information about the Swiss Tropical and Public Health Institute - Switzerland

Medical research institutes in Switzerland
International development organizations
Public health organizations
Tropical medicine organizations
University of Basel
2009 establishments in Switzerland